The Yokohama Harbors are an American football team located in Yokohama, Japan.  They are a member of the X-League.

Seasons

References

External links
  (Japanese)

American football in Japan
1973 establishments in Japan
American football teams established in 1973
X-League teams